Agenaric, also called Serapio, was an Alemannic prince in the 4th century. Agenaric was the son of petty king Mederic and the nephew of another petty king, Chnodomarius. In 357, together with his uncle, Agenaric commanded the Alemannic army at the Battle of Strasbourg, in which the Alemanni were defeated by Julian.

References
 Dieter Geuenich: Geschichte der Alemannen (Kohlhammer-Urban-Taschenbücher. 575). 2., überarbeitete Auflage. Kohlhammer Verlag, Stuttgart 2005, pp. 42-45 (German)
 Knut Schäferdiek: Serapio. In: Reallexikon der Germanischen Altertumskunde (RGA). 2. Auflage. Band 28, Walter de Gruyter, Berlin / New York 2005, p. 194 (German)

4th-century Germanic people
Alemannic rulers
Alemannic warriors